It's Always Jan is an American situation comedy that aired on CBS during the 1955-1956 television season. The series stars Janis Paige as a widowed nightclub singer struggling to make ends meet.

Synopsis
Janis Stewart is a war widow and struggling nightclub singer who lives in an apartment in New York City on the East Side of Manhattan with her 10-year-old daughter Josie. Jan faces the challenges of raising Josie as a single mother, and her finances are precarious. To help pay the rent, Jan and Josie share their small apartment with two women who are friends of Jan: Pat Murphy, a secretary for a theatrical producer, and Val Marlowe, an aspiring actress and model. Harry Cooper is Jan's longtime agent and loyal friend. Stanley Schreiber is the 20-year-old son of the man who owns the neighborhood delicatessen and works as a delivery boy there.

Jan performs regularly at Tony's Cellar, a nightclub in Manhattan. She is talented and hopes for bigger things in her career, but never gets the big break in show business she hopes for. Jan, Pat, and Val often bicker with one another over the eligible bachelors they meet and compete with one another for the men's attention.

Cast
 Janis Paige...Janis Stewart
 Patricia Bright...Pat Murphy
 Merry Anders...Val Marlowe
 Jeri Lou James...Josie Stewart
 Arte Johnson...Stanley Schreiber 
 Sid Melton...Harry Cooper

Production

Desilu Productions and Janard Productions, a partnership of Janis Paige and series producer Arthur Stander, co-produced It′s Always Jan. Paige sang a song in most episodes. Her Jan Stewart character′s hairstyle resembled that of Lucille Ball′s Lucy Ricardo character on the hit series I Love Lucy, also filmed at Desilu. Each episode ended with the Jan Stewart character turning to the camera and saying "Good night" to the television audience.

In mid-December 1955, Patricia Bright broke her right kneecap and Merry Anders had to leave the show to have a baby. Episodes were written so that Bright's Pat Murphy character could appear only while sitting down, and Anders's Val Marlowe character was temporarily written out of the series. After her baby's birth, Anders and her Val character returned to the series.

It′s Always Jan′s premise bore similarities to the plots of two hit movies, 1953′s How to Marry a Millionaire and 1954′s Three Coins in the Fountain, both of which also featured three man-chasing women. Merry Anders, who portrayed Val Marlowe in It's Always Jan, went on to star in the 1958–1959 syndicated television series How to Marry a Millionaire.

Broadcast history

It's Always Jan premiered on CBS on September 10, 1955. It lasted only a single season, and its last original episode aired on April 28, 1956. CBS broadcast reruns of It′s Always Jan in prime time during 1956 from May 12 to May 26 and from June 9 to June 30. The show was broadcast from 9:30 to 10:00 p.m. Eastern Time on Saturdays throughout its prime-time run.

After It′s Always Jan′s CBS run ended, NBC aired reruns of the show on weekday afternoons as episodes of the network's Comedy Time series from August 12 to September 21, 1956.

Episodes
SOURCE

References

External links
  
 It's Always Jan opening credits on YouTube
 It's Always Jan episode "Guilty Conscience" at archive.org

1950s American sitcoms
1955 American television series debuts
1956 American television series endings
Black-and-white American television shows
CBS original programming
Television series by Desilu Productions
Television shows set in New York City
English-language television shows